Kim Sang-gon (born 5 December 1949) is the politician who is a former Minister of Education of South Korea, as well as a former Deputy Prime Minister. In June 2017, he was nominated by President Moon Jae-in and would be appointed to both positions in July.

Biography

Kim graduated from Gwangju Jeil High School in 1968, and attended Seoul National University, graduating with a BA (1976), MA (1982), and Ph.D (1992) in Business administration. From 1983 to 2009, he would serve as a professor of business administration at Hanshin University. From 1999 to 200, he would serve as President of the Korean Association of Labor Studies. In 2009, he was appointed Superintendent of Education in Gyeonggi Province, serving in the post until 2014. Kim would join the Democratic Party (then the New Politics Alliance for Democracy), and would serve as Chairman of its Innovation Council and Human Resources Recruitment Council. From April to May 2017, he would serve as Co-Chairman of the Presidential Election Council.

References

Living people
1949 births
People from Gwangju
Seoul National University alumni
Deputy Prime Ministers of South Korea
Education ministers of South Korea